Katharina "Karin" Margareta Mader (1910-1973) was a Dutch artist known for her floral paintings

Biography 
Mader was born on 27 February 1910 in Bayreuth, Germany. She was a student of Josef Verheijen. Her work was included in the 1939 exhibition and sale Onze Kunst van Heden (Our Art of Today) at the Rijksmuseum in Amsterdam. She was a member of the Federatie van Verenigingen van Beroeps Beeldende Kunstenaars (Federation of Associations of Professional Visual Artists) in Amsterdam. Mader died on 11 July 1973 in Amstelveen.

References

External links 
images of Mader's work on Simonis & Buunk
images of Mader's work on Invaluable

1910 births
1973 deaths
People from Bayreuth
20th-century Dutch women artists
German emigrants to the Netherlands